The fourth season of the American television sitcom The Nanny aired on CBS from September 18, 1996, to May 21, 1997. The series was created by actress Fran Drescher and her-then husband Peter Marc Jacobson, and developed by Prudence Fraser and Robert Sternin. Produced by Sternin and Fraser Ink Inc., Highschool Sweethearts and TriStar Television, the series features Drescher, Jacobson, Fraser, Sternin, Caryn Lucas and Diane Wilk as executive producers.

Based on an idea inspired by Drescher's visit with a friend and The Sound of Music, the season revolves around Fran Fine, a Jewish woman from Flushing, Queens, New York, who is hired by a wealthy Broadway producer to be the nanny to his three children. Drescher stars as the titular character, Charles Shaughnessy as British-born producer Maxwell Sheffield, and the children – Maggie, Brighton and Grace – portrayed by Nicholle Tom, Benjamin Salisbury, and Madeline Zima. The series also features Daniel Davis as Niles, the family butler, and Lauren Lane as C.C. Babcock, Maxwell's associate in his production company who is smitten with him. Several recurring characters also played a role in the sitcoms plotlines, many of whom were related to Fran.

Cast and characters

Main
 Fran Drescher as Fran Fine
 Charles Shaughnessy as Maxwell Sheffield
 Daniel Davis as Niles
 Lauren Lane as Chastity Claire "C.C" Babcock
 Nicholle Tom as Maggie Sheffield
 Benjamin Salisbury as Brighton Sheffield
 Madeline Zima as Grace Sheffield

Recurring
 Renée Taylor as Sylvia Fine
 Ann Morgan Guilbert as Yetta Rosenberg
 Rachel Chagall as Val Toriello
 Spalding Gray as Dr. Jack Miller

Guest stars
 Steve Lawrence as Morty Fine
 Joey Dente as Pauly
 Brian Bloom as John
 Sean Kanan as Mike McMullen
 Jackie Tohn as Francine
 Marilyn Cooper as Grandma Nettie Fine
 George Furth as Minister
 Dana Gould as Josh Bassin
 Sally Kirkland as Tattoo Lady
 Les Brandt as Rico
 Darryl Hickman as Mr. Binder
 Joel Murray as Val's Date
 Brenda Epperson as Danielle
 Robert Costanzo as Juror #4
 Luigi Amodeo as Vincenzo / Bernie Schwartzberg
 Gloria Gifford as District Attorney
 Barry Livingston as Defense Attorney
 Laura Kightlinger as Kiki Hanson
 Fred Stoller as Fred, the pharmacist
 Michael Brandon as Stan
 Jane Sibbett as Marcy Feldman / Morgan Faulkner
 Ivana Milicevic as Tasha
 Lois Chiles as Elaine
 Ed Begley Jr. as Tom Rosenstein
 Stanley Kamel as Condo Representative
 Alicia Machado as Miss Universe
 Darryl Hickman as Doctor

Special guest stars
 Jason Alexander as Jack
 Nora Dunn as Mrs. Richardson
 Rosie O'Donnell as herself
 Donald Trump as himself
 John McDaniel as himself
 Donald O'Connor as Fred
 Lainie Kazan as Aunt Freida
 Joan Collins as Joan Sheffield
 Robert Vaughn as James Sheffield
 Jay Leno as himself
 Rich Little as IRS Appeals Officer
 Monty Hall as himself
 Harry Van Gorkum as Nigel Sheffield
 John Astin as Dr. Roberts
 Roslyn Kind as herself
 Todd Graff as Harvey
 Pamela Anderson as Heather Biblow-Imperiali
 Myra Carter as Grandma Eloise
 Jon Stewart as Bobby
 Gordon Thomson as Chandler
 Peter Scolari as Leslie Tilbert	
 Robert Urich as Judge Jerry Moran
 Telma Hopkins as Lila Baker
 Jayne Meadows as herself
 Bette Midler as herself
 Peter Bergman as himself
 Richard Kline as himself
 Jeanne Cooper as herself
 Shemar Moore as himself
 Joshua Morrow as himself
 Brook Mahealani Lee as herself
 Melody Thomas Scott as herself
 Hunter Tylo as herself
 Elizabeth Taylor as herself 
 Céline Dion as herself

Episodes

<onlyinclude>

References

External links
 

1996 American television seasons
1997 American television seasons
The Nanny